Burr Mansion, or Burr House, is a historic house built in 1875, and is located at 1772 Vallejo Street in the Cow Hollow neighborhood of San Francisco, California. It was commissioned by Ephraim Willard Burr, the 8th mayor of San Francisco, for his son upon his marriage engagement.

The 19th century home is listed as a San Francisco Designated Landmark since May 3, 1970; and listed as one of the National Register of Historic Places since June 8, 2015.

History 
The Burr Mansion was designed by architect Edmund M. Wharf as an Italianate-style house, with a French Second Empire-style mansard roof. The house is three-story tall wood construction with a brick foundation and basement. It was commissioned as a wedding gift for his son Edmond Coffin Burr (1846–1927) and his fiancé, Anna Barnard (1847–1920), and was built between 1875 and 1878 on a 12,535 square foot lot. The Burr Mansion sits on one of the largest parcels of land in the city, which has a cottage and garden. Burr's daughter Alice (1883–1968) exclusively used the garden cottage.

The mansion served as the Humanistic Psychology Institute (later known as Saybrook University) starting from 1970/1971. The house was restored and renovated from 2000 to 2003 by the English firm Smallbone. In 2009, the property featured a wine cellar, a media room, and exercise room. 

In 2022, the house was placed for sale on the real estate market for $12.9 million USD, with a 7,077 square foot interior with 6-bedrooms and 4.5-bathrooms.

See also 
 List of San Francisco Designated Landmarks
 National Register of Historic Places listings in San Francisco

References 

Houses in San Francisco
San Francisco Designated Landmarks
National Register of Historic Places in San Francisco
Houses completed in 1875
Houses on the National Register of Historic Places in San Francisco